An apron is a functional accessory that has been worn for thousands of years as a protective, fashionable, and/or ceremonial top layer.

Apron may also refer to:

Architecture and construction
 Apron (architecture), a raised section of ornamental stonework below a window ledge, stone tablet, or monument
 Apron, an area of pavement on a motorsport circuit that separates the racing surface from the infield
 Apron, the flexible lower container of the air cushion of a hovercraft, also known as its skirt
 Apron, a ramp used to connect shoreside facilities with a barge or ferry, also known as a linkspan
 Airport apron, an area where aircraft are parked and serviced
 Apron stage, a part of a stage that extends past the proscenium arch and into the audience or seating area
Apron, a large plastic panel at the bottom of a pinball table that directs the ball towards the drain.

Biology
 Apron, elongated labia minora
 Zingel asper, a species of fish sometimes known as an apron

Garments
 Cobbler apron, a type of tabard
 Dudou, a Chinese undergarment and blouse sometimes known as an apron

See also
 Blue Apron, an ingredient-and-recipe meal kit service
 Luxury tax apron, a feature of the NBA salary cap